The United States Hunter/Jumper Association, or USHJA, is the governing body for hunt seat and show jumping in the United States. The mission statement of the USHJA is to "unify and represent the interests of all levels of participants in order to promote and enhance the hunter and jumper disciplines and provide educational experiences in a manner that will benefit both horses and members."

The USHJA was formed in 2004 with Bill Moroney of Aldie, Virginia at the lead.  It has since expanded to include major elements of training, promotion, collaboration, and quality within the Hunter/Jumper field.  The USHJA facility was recently completed in Lexingon, KY and a USHJA Foundation has been developed as well.

Major roles include:

Representing all levels of riding in the hunter and jumper disciplines in the United States, not just the Olympic competitors, and giving a voice to all members of every level. The USHJA bridges the international, national, state, regional, and local levels of the discipline.
Providing educational experiences for both human and equine, including riders, trainers, coaches, grooms, and parents through clinics and classes that are specially designed to help each individual become more successful. 
Setting rules to benefit the welfare of the horses in the discipline.
Help govern the discipline through a more efficient rule change process.

The organization is an affiliate of the USEF (United States Equestrian Federation).

Early History 
The USHJA was founded during a breakfast meeting at the 2003 USEF Board of Directors meeting in Lexington, Kentucky. At this gathering, the idea of forming an organization specified to hunter/jumper equestrians was introduced. Committees who could help further the goal were then created to fulfill the creation of the organization. 

The USHJA created zones for different regions of the country who have different needs. There are 12 zones in total, each are represented by a zone committee. Zone committees address issues brought to them and can then bring those issues to USHJA leadership. Members of the committees are appointed by peers via election or by presidential appointment.

External links
USHJA.ORG

Equestrian organizations
Hunter and Jumper
Hunt seat
Show jumping
Equestrian sports in the United States
Equestrian organizations headquartered in Kentucky